Yuriy Shatalov (born 15 September 1963) is a retired Ukrainian-Russian professional football coach and former player. He was coach of Polish side Górnik Łęczna from 2013 until his resignation on 6 May 2016.

He has dual Ukrainian and Polish citizenship.

Career
He played for several clubs in Europe, including Pārdaugava Rīga in the Soviet First League and Amica Wronki the Polish Ekstraklasa.

Honours

Club
Amica Wronki
 Polish Cup (1): 1997/98

References

External links
 
 

1963 births
Living people
People from Primorsky Krai
Russian emigrants to Ukraine
Polish people of Russian descent
Soviet footballers
Ukrainian footballers
Ukrainian expatriate footballers
Expatriate footballers in Russia
Expatriate footballers in Poland
FC Shakhtar Donetsk players
FC Mariupol players
FC Kryvbas Kryvyi Rih players
FC Podillya Khmelnytskyi players
FC APK Morozovsk players
Warta Poznań players
Amica Wronki players
Ukrainian football managers
Polish football managers
Jagiellonia Białystok managers
Polonia Bytom managers
MKS Cracovia managers
Zawisza Bydgoszcz managers
Górnik Łęczna managers
Association football defenders
GKS Tychy managers
Naturalized citizens of Poland
Russian expatriate football managers
Ukrainian expatriate football managers
Sportspeople from Primorsky Krai